Pablo Ortiz (January 25, 1952 - September 11, 2001) was an American construction superintendent. He worked for the New York Port Authority, the organization that managed the World Trade Center, and is credited with playing a central role in rescuing at least 77 people who were trapped in the building's elevators during the September 11 attacks.  Survivors describe last seeing him ascending a stairwell to go open more elevators with his friend and colleague Francis "Frank" De Martini.

 On September 11, 2001. Ortiz and De Martini worked on the 88th floor of the North Tower, just a few floors down from the impact.  The impact injured some occupants on their floor. Doors were jammed shut when the door frames were twisted. Ortiz, De Martini and their colleagues, Pete Negron, Carlos da Costa, determined that only one stairwell could be made accessible, after clearing some debris. After sending the occupants of their floor down that stairwell to safety, they set about rescuing their fellow occupants on the next floor up.

Ortiz, De Martini, da Costa and Negron all died, still trying to save fellow occupants, when the building collapsed at 10:28 A.M.

In August 2003 authorities released many transcripts from 911 telephone calls, and from the radios of first responders.  Jim Dwyer's summary of those transcripts described, in detail, the heroic acts of Ortiz, De Martini and their colleagues. Dwyer eventually wrote a book about the collapse, 102 Minutes, where he wrote they "pushed back the boundary line between life and death in favor of the living".

Ortiz was a former Navy SEAL.

References

Victims of the September 11 attacks
People from New York City
American builders
United States Navy SEALs personnel
1952 births
2001 deaths
Port Authority of New York and New Jersey people